Syed Mohd Zakir Bin Syed Othman Al-Yahya (born 4 February 1969 in Kota Bharu, Kelantan, Malaysia), is a Malaysian writer of prose, poetry, and theatrical texts.

Biography
S.M. Zakir involves himself in the writing of short stories, essays, poetry, and novels. Some of his works were published in magazines and journals, such as Dewan Sastera, Dewan Budaya, Dewan Masyarakat, Pelita Bahasa, Bahasa, Dewan Siswa, Perisa Journal, Malay Literature Journal, Pangsura Journal, Aswara Journal, Milenia Muslim, Pentas, and others; and newspapers like Berita Minggu, Berita Harian, Utusan Melayu, Utusan Zaman, Minggu Malaysia, and others. His published works in book forms are an adolescent novel Di Bawah Lembayung (DBP, 1991); a classical novel Kembang Kanigara (DBP, 1992), novel Ahli Politik (Nusabuku, 2012), compilations of short stories Merengkuh Langit (DBP, 1995), Fatamorgana (Sasbadi, 1997), Sekuntum Kembang di Sayap Jibril (Pustaka Nusa Publication, 2001), Menyirat Nirmala (DBP, 2004), Sekeping Ruh di Atas Bantal (PPN, 2005), and Serigala dan Sekuntum Tulip (DBP, 2010); poetry compilations  Memburu Malaikat (PPN, 2007), and Sajak-sajak Petualang: Manusia Cinta (PPN, 2009); and a luxurious edition biography Seniman Negara Ke-7 Datuk (Dr) Ahmad Nawab (JKKN, 2008). He also produced a book of philosophical essays Pascamoden Kutukan Terhadap Falsafah dan Agama (Nusabuku, 2010).

He is also active in writing criticism on films, theatres and culture. Among his books of essay on film criticism are Sinema (Nusabuku, 2010) and Filem dan Pemikiran (Nusabuku, 2010). He was also a columnist of Mingguan Watan 1996–1998, editor for literary magazine Akar, short stories analyst for Tunas Cipta magazine December 2003 – December 2006, writer for novel in series in Milena Muslim magazine July 2004 – March 2007, columnist for "Review" (films) column, "Pemikiran Islam" and "Kerana Nila Setitik" (Community) for Milenia Muslim magazine 2006-now, columnist for Massa magazine (politics) 2005–2006, columnist for "Kuala Lumpur Selepas Senja (Theatre) for Pentas magazine, columnist for "Dunia Tanpa Tirai" (Politics) for Mingguan Wasilah tabloid January 2008 – May 2009, and columnist for culture and general column in Suara Baru magazine August 2008 – March 2009.

He has the experience as a jury panel for tens of literary competitions since 2002, and speaker in tens of literary workshops since 2003. He was also invited to present tens of working papers at home and abroad, such as Indonesia, Negara Brunei Darussalam, Singapore and Thailand. In writers' organisation, he was Deputy Co-ordinator for Young Writers' Secretariat in GAPENA (SPMG) 2002–2003 and Secretary-General for Persatuan Penulis Nasional Malaysia (PENA) 2006–2008 session, 2008–2010 session, and 2010–2012 session. He is now a freelance writer besides managing his own publishing house Nusabuku Enterprise, and establishing Nusa Centre, a research centre for culture and science.

Awards
 2010 Anugerah Sasterawan Muda MASTERA 2010 (MASTERA Young Laureate Award 2010) from the Literary Council of Southeast Asia (Mastera Literary Award) in Jakarta, Indonesia.
 2011 S.E.A Write Award 2011 in short story category, awarded by SEA Write Award Council in Bangkok, Thailand. Malaysian Premier Literary Prizes
 Utusan-Public Bank Literary Prizes
 Utusan-ExxonMobil Literary Prizes
 DBP-Maybank Literary Prizes
 DBP-DBKL Literary Prize in commemoration with Kuala Lumpur Centennial
 Formula Malaysia Literary Prize
 State of Kelantan Literary Awards
 Film criticism award by GAPIM

Publications
 Adolescent Novel Di Bawah Lembayung (Dewan Bahasa dan Pustaka. Kuala Lumpur. 1991)
 Classic Novel Kembang Kanigara (Dewan Bahasa dan Pustaka. Kuala Lumpur.1992)
 Short Stories Compilation Merengkuh Langit (Dewan Bahasa dan Pustaka. Kuala Lumpur. 1995)
 Anthology of Short Stories Fatamorgana (Sasbadi. Kuala Lumpr.1997)
 Compilation of Short Stories Sekuntum Kembang di Sayap Jibril (Pustaka Nusa Publication Sdn. Bhd. Selangor. 2001)
 Compilation of Short Stories Menyirat Nirmala (Dewan Bahasa dan Pustaka. Kuala Lumpur. 2004)
 Compilation of Short Stories Sekeping Ruh di Atas Bantal (Pustaka Nusa Publication Sdn. Bhd. Selangor. 2005)
 Compilation of Poems Memburu Malaikat (Pustaka Nusa Publication Sdn. Bhd. Selangor. 2006)
 Biography (luxurious edition) of 7th National Artist Datuk (Dr) Ahmad Nawab (Jabatan Kebudayaan dan Kesenian Negara/National Department for Culture and Arts. 2008)
 Poetry Compilation Sajak-sajak Petualang; Manusia Cinta (Pustaka Nusa Publication Sdn. Bhd. Selangor. 2009)
 Compilation of Essays (Socio-politics) Dunia Tanpa Tirai (Pustaka Nusa Publication Sdn. Bhd. Selangor. 2009)
 Compilation of Essays (Philosophy) Pascamoden Kutukan Terhadap Falsafah & Agama (Pustaka Nusa Publication Sdn. Bhd. Selangor. 2010)
 Compilation of Essays (Films) Sinema (Pustaka Nusa Publication Sdn. Bhd. Selangor. 2010)
 Compilation of Essays (Critics on Films) Filem & Pemikiran (Pustaka Nusa Publication Sdn. Bhd. Selangor. 2010)
 Compilation of Short Stories Serigala dan Sekuntum Tulip (Dewan Bahasa dan Pustaka/Institute of Language and Literature. KualaLumpur. 2010)
 Novel Ahli Politik (Nusabuku Enterprise, Kuala Lumpur. 2012)

Short stories
List of S.M. Zakir's short stories that received awards/prizes

Literary Essays
 Orientalisme, Weltliteratur Gharb Zadegi & Sastera Melayu, Main Prize (Article) in Utusan-ExxonMobil Literary Prizes 2003
 Cinta Dalam Konsep Saeculum, GAPIM Tinta Prizes 2008 (Essay on Films – Dewan Budaya, February 2007)
 Penulis Ulul Albab dan Newman, Main Prize (Essay) in Utusan-ExxonMobil Literary Prizes 2008

Poetry
 Sepotong Cinta di Dunia Angin, Main Prize (Poetry) in Utusan-ExxonMobil Literary Prizes 2008
 Aroma, Main Prize (Poetry) in Utusan-ExxonMobil Literary Prizes 2009 and Malaysian Premier 19th Literary Prizes (2008–2009) Loose Category (Poems)

Compilations of Short Stories
 Merengkuh Langit (DBP, 1995), Malaysian Premier Literary Prizes 1994/1995 Compilation of Short Stories Category
 Sekuntum Kembang di Sayap Jibril, The State of Kelantan Literary Awards 2001–2002 Compilation of Short Stories Category

Theatre
Cinta Si Pemain Pedang.  Was staged at DBP Store, Dewan Bahasa dan Pustaka, Kuala Lumpur, on 15–18 November 2006.

References

External links
 
  SM Zakir Penerima SEA Write Awards 2011

Malaysian people of Malay descent
Malaysian Muslims
Malaysian writers
Living people
1969 births
People from Kelantan
S.E.A. Write Award winners